Matheus Queiroz Moura (born 12 February 1996), commonly known as Queiroz, is a Brazilian footballer who currently plays as a midfielder for São Paulo.

Career statistics

Club

Notes

References

1996 births
Living people
Brazilian footballers
Association football midfielders
São Paulo FC players
Boa Esporte Clube players
Clube de Regatas Brasil players